Socomim is a neighbourhood at center of the city of Telêmaco Borba, Brazil.

References

Neighbourhoods in Telêmaco Borba